Iota Aurigae (ι Aurigae, abbreviated Iota Aur, ι Aur), officially named Hassaleh , is a star in the northern constellation of Auriga. It has an apparent visual magnitude of 2.7, which is bright enough to be readily visible to the naked eye.

Nomenclature 

ι Aurigae (Latinised to Iota Aurigae) is the star's Bayer designation.

It bore the traditional name Al Kab, short for Kabdhilinan , from the Arabic   "the ankle of the rein holder (charioteer)". Under the name Alkab, this star is a marker on the astrolabe described by Geoffrey Chaucer in his Treatise on the Astrolabe in 1391.

It bore the novel name Hassaleh in Antonín Bečvář's 1951 atlas. The origin and meaning of the name have not been discovered despite extensive search, and no connection to any language has been discovered.  The IAU Working Group on Star Names (WGSN)has approved the proper name Hassaleh for this star.

It is known as 五車一 (the First Star of the Five Chariots) in Chinese.

Properties 

At Iota Aurigae's distance, extinction from interstellar dust is causing a magnitude reduction of about 0.6. Examination of the spectrum yields a stellar classification of K3 II, with the luminosity class of 'II' indicating this is a category of evolved star known as a bright giant. Since 1943, the spectrum of this star has served as one of the stable anchor points by which other stars are classified. The effective temperature of the outer envelope is 4,160 K, which is cooler than the Sun's effective temperature and gives Iota Aurigae the orange hue of a K-type star.

This is a suspected variable star, although this variability remains unconfirmed.

Unconfirmed substellar companions 
During the Extreme Solar Systems conference held on June 25–29, 2007, in Santorini, Greece, Reffert et al. announced the detection of two substellar objects orbiting Iota Aurigae in 2:1 resonance. Such companions would be brown dwarfs with orbital periods of approximately 2 and 4 years. No minimum mass for the candidates was provided. So far the detection has not been confirmed, though Hekker et al. (2008) listed significant radial velocity variations at periods of 767 and 1586 days.

References

External links
 HR 1577
 The Constellations and Named Stars
 Image Iota Aurigae
Extreme Solar Systems posters
Extreme Solar Systems Abstracts

031398
023015
Aurigae, Iota
Auriga (constellation)
K-type bright giants
Hassaleh
Hypothetical planetary systems
Aurigae, 03
1577
BD+32 0855